Norbertas is a Lithuanian masculine given name. It is a cognate of the name Norbert. Individuals with the name include:
Norbertas Giga (born 1995), Lithuanian basketball player 
Norbertas Vėlius (1938–1996), Lithuanian folklorist

References

Lithuanian masculine given names